Ben Hamed Koné (born 2 November 1987) is an Ivorian professional footballer who plays as an attacking midfielder for Maltese club Gżira United.

Club career

Feronikeli
On 30 January 2018, Koné joined Football Superleague of Kosovo side Feronikeli and he played 13 games for the club, 10 as starter before leaving in May of the following year.

Neuchâtel Xamax
On 7 June 2018, Koné signed Swiss Super League side Neuchâtel Xamax. On 11 June 2018, the club confirmed that Koné had joined on a permanent transfer. On 21 July 2018, he made his debut in a 0–2 away win against Luzern after being named in the starting line-up.

Return to Feronikeli
On 30 January 2019, Koné returned to Football Superleague of Kosovo side Feronikeli.

Gzira United

On 25 June 2019, Koné moved to Maltese Premier League side Gżira United. On 18 July 2019, Koné scored twice in a Europa League qualifier against Hajduk Split, his first goals for the club.

References

External links

Hamed Koné at Neuchâtel Xamax

1987 births
Living people
Footballers from Abidjan
Ivorian footballers
Ivorian expatriate sportspeople in Romania
Association football midfielders
Association football forwards
Hamed Kone
Singapore Premier League players
Home United FC players
Japan Football League players
J2 League players
Gainare Tottori players
Liga I players
LPS HD Clinceni players
FC Voluntari players
UAE Pro League players
Dibba FC players
Football Superleague of Kosovo players
KF Feronikeli players
Swiss Super League players
Neuchâtel Xamax FCS players
Ivorian expatriate sportspeople in Thailand